GNOME Disks is a graphical front-end for udisks. It can be used for partition management, S.M.A.R.T. monitoring, benchmarking, and software RAID (until v. 3.12). An introduction is included in the GNOME Documentation Project.

Disks used to be known as GNOME Disk Utility or palimpsest Disk Utility. Udisks was named DeviceKit-disks in earlier releases. DeviceKit-disks is part of DeviceKit which was planned to replace certain aspects of HAL. HAL and DeviceKit have been deprecated.

GNOME Disks has been included by default in several Linux distributions including Debian, Ubuntu, Linux Mint, Trisquel, Fedora, Red Hat Enterprise Linux and CentOS.

See also

 List of disk partitioning software
 System monitor
 Comparison of S.M.A.R.T. tools
 GParted – another alternative
 Disk utility

References

External links
 Releases at freedesktop.org
 Palimpsest Disk Utility Manual at gnome.org
 udisks and gnome-disk-utility - past, present and future by David Zeuthen
 Udisks Improvements at fedoraproject.org
 Devicekit at fedoraproject.org

Free software programmed in C
GNOME Core Applications
Red Hat software
Software that uses GTK
Software that uses Meson
Free partitioning software
Linux file system-related software